The Ms. Kelly Tour was the second concert tour by American R&B recording artist Kelly Rowland. It was launched in support of her second studio album Ms. Kelly (2007). The tour began on October 30, 2007 in Sacramento, California and ended on December 1, 2007 in Las Vegas. American R&B singer Mario opened for Rowland at selected venues. The tour showcased Rowland performing songs from her albums Simply Deep and Ms. Kelly as well as in-concert surprises from the Destiny's Child repertoire and more.

Background
The Ms. Kelly Tour was Rowland's first North American tour to promote her second studio album Ms. Kelly (2007), which had been released three months prior. She previously headlined the Simply Deeper Tour in Europe for her solo debut album Simply Deep (2002). The Ms. Kelly Tour was originally scheduled to hit fifteen cities between October 2007 and December 2007, with a three-night finale in Las Vegas. However, the three scheduled tour dates in Seattle, San Francisco and West Hollywood were cancelled with no ticket refunds. R&B crooner Mario was the tour's opening act.

Opening act
Mario

Shows

Cancelled shows

See also

List of Kelly Rowland live performances

References

Kelly Rowland concert tours
2007 concert tours